Kevin Xavier Punter Jr. (born June 25, 1993) is an American-born naturalized Serbian professional basketball player for Partizan Belgrade of the Serbian KLS, the Adriatic League and the EuroLeague. After playing two years each of college basketball at State Fair Community College, and at Tennessee, Punter entered the 2016 NBA draft, but he was not selected in the draft's two rounds.

In addition to being a citizen of the United States, Punter also has Serbian citizenship.

High school career
Following high school, Punter spent one year attending the Body of Christ Christian Academy, in Raleigh, North Carolina. In his lone season at Body of Christ, he averaged 24.2 points and 2.5 steals.

College career 
After high school, Punter played college basketball at State Fair CC, from 2012 to 2014, and at the University of Tennessee, with the Tennessee Volunteers. In his senior year at Tennessee, Punter averaged 22.1 points per game, and 3.4 rebounds per game. Though he missed five games of SEC Conference play, he was named Second Team All-SEC, after finishing with the third-highest scoring average (22.1 points per game), and the fourth-highest free-throw percentage (.853), during conference league games.

Professional career
After failing to be drafted in the 2016 NBA draft, Punter played with the Minnesota Timberwolves in the 2016 NBA Summer League. In 2016, he signed with Lavrio of the Greek Basket League. He played in 21 games for Lavrio, averaging 12.2 points, 2.4 rebounds, and 0.9 assists per game. On March 27, 2017, he left Lavrio, and signed with the Antwerp Giants, until the end of the season.

In July 2017, he signed with Rosa Radom. He played in 16 games with Rosa Radom, and went on to average 20.6 points, 3.4 rebounds, and 1.7 assists per game in the FIBA Basketball Champions League. His very good performances gained the interest of the Turkish Super League club Gaziantep, in February but the player didn't leave the team.

On February 10, 2018, he moved to AEK Athens for the rest of the season. With AEK, he won the Greek Cup title, in 2018. On May 6, 2018, Punter also won the FIBA Champions League title. In the final, Punter was one of the best players of his team, scoring 16 points.

On July 6, 2018, Punter signed a deal with Virtus Bologna for the 2018–19 season. He led the team to winning the Basketball Champions League crown by posting 21 points and eight rebounds in the semifinal over Brose Bamberg, plus 27 points and seven rebounds in the Final against Iberostar Tenerife. He claimed MVP of the Final Four, after also being named to the competition's Star Lineup.

On June 28, 2019, Punter signed a two-year contract with the Greek EuroLeague club Olympiacos. On December 24, 2019, he was released by Olympiacos. Three days later, he signed with the Serbian EuroLeague club Crvena zvezda for the rest of the season. On February 11, 2020, Punter obtained a Serbian passport and Serbian citizenship.

On June 18, 2020, Punter signed with the Italian EuroLeague club Olimpia Milano. With Olimpia, he appeared in 36 EuroLeague games, and averaged 14.3 points, 1.6 rebounds and 1.4 assists per game. Olimpia managed to reach the 2021 EuroLeague Final Four, where they won the third place.

On July 2, 2021, he has signed a two-year contract with Partizan Belgrade of the ABA League.

Career statistics

Domestic Leagues

Regular season

|-
| style="text-align:left;"| 2017–18
| style="text-align:left;"| AEK
| align=center | GBL
| 11 || 20.4 || .440 || .405 || .909 || 2.3 || .8 || .8 || .1 || 11.4 
|}

FIBA Champions League

|-
| style="text-align:left;" | 2017–18
| style="text-align:left;" | Rosa Radom
| 16 || 31.0 || .429 || .358 || .785 || 3.4 || 1.7 || 1.4 || .1 || 20.6
|-
| style="text-align:left;background:#AFE6BA;" | 2017–18†
| style="text-align:left;" | A.E.K.
| 6 || 23.1 || .470 || .419 || .680 || 2.2 || 1.0 || 1.2 || .2 || 15.3
|-
| style="text-align:left;background:#AFE6BA;" | 2018–19†
| style="text-align:left;" | Virtus Bologna
| 20 || 27.0 || .449 || .418 || .807 || 3.4 || 1.7 || 1.1 || .3 || 16.0
|}

Awards and accomplishments

College career
 Second-team All-SEC: (2016)

Pro career
2 x FIBA Champions League Champion: (2018, 2019)
 Basketball Champions League Final Four MVP: (2019)
 Greek Cup Winner: (2018)

References

External links 
 Tennessee Volunteers College Profile
 Kevin Punter at eurobasket.com
 Kevin Punter at euroleague.net
 Kevin Punter at esake.gr 
 Kevin Punnter at legabasket.it

1993 births
Living people
ABA League players
AEK B.C. players
American expatriate basketball people in Belgium
American expatriate basketball people in Greece
American expatriate basketball people in Italy
American expatriate basketball people in Poland
American expatriate basketball people in Serbia
American men's basketball players
Antwerp Giants players
Basketball players from New York City
Junior college men's basketball players in the United States
KK Crvena zvezda players
KK Partizan players
Naturalized citizens of Serbia
Lavrio B.C. players
Lega Basket Serie A players
Olimpia Milano players
Olympiacos B.C. players
Point guards
Rosa Radom players
Serbian expatriate basketball people in Belgium
Serbian expatriate basketball people in Greece
Serbian expatriate basketball people in Italy
Serbian expatriate basketball people in Poland
Serbian men's basketball players
Serbian people of African-American descent
Shooting guards
Sportspeople from the Bronx
Tennessee Volunteers basketball players
Virtus Bologna players